Wolgok Station is a railway station on Seoul Subway Line 6 located in Hawolgok-dong, Seongbuk-gu, Seoul. Its station subname is Dongduk Women's University, as it is within the vicinity of Dongduk Women's University.

Station layout

References 

Railway stations opened in 2000
Metro stations in Seongbuk District
Seoul Metropolitan Subway stations
Railway stations at university and college campuses